Tymbochoos is an extinct genus of encrusting tentaculitoid tubeworms. Tymbochoos has a laminar tube structure and pseudopuncta similar to those of the tentaculitoids. It has previously been interpreted as a Palaeozoic polychaete. The world's oldest build-ups with tube-supported frameworks belong to Tymbochoos sinclairi. They occur in the Ordovician limestones of the Ottawa Valley.

References

Protostome enigmatic taxa
Tentaculita
Ordovician invertebrates
Ordovician animals of North America
Paleozoic life of Ontario